Ballinabranna or Ballinabrannagh is a small village in County Carlow, Ireland. It is located approximately 8 kilometres south of Carlow and 5 kilometres from Junction 6 of the M9 motorway. It is within the townland of Ballinabrannagh, and is in the barony of Idrone West.  As of the 2016 census, the population of the village was 466.

History
Traditionally a rural townland, it developed into a nucleated village due to its proximity to the M9 motorway. The Milford Park and Gort na Gréine housing developments, built in the late-2000s and 2010s respectively, significantly expanded the population of the area. It was first included (as Ballinabrannagh) in the CSO's list of census towns for the 2011 census, at which time it had a population of 389 people.

The village has a church (St. Fintan's), a child daycare, a GAA club/gym, and a national (primary) school. As of 2014, the school (Ballinabranna National School) had an enrollment of approximately 170 pupils.

See also
 List of towns and villages in Ireland

References

Towns and villages in County Carlow